Walkerville Collegiate Institute (WCI) is a secondary school (grades 9 to 12) in the Walkerville area of Windsor, Ontario and managed by the Greater Essex County District School Board. It is the home of the Walkerville Centre for the Creative Arts (WCCA), which has arts programs in drama, dance, visual arts, media, and vocal.

Walkerville hosts one of three Community Living (STEPS Programs) in the district, which serves more than 30 developmentally challenged students. Walkerville also has sports teams which include basketball, soccer, volleyball, tennis, and badminton.

Walkerville's feeder schools include:
 King Edward Public School
 Hugh Beaton Public School
 Prince Edward Public School 
 FW Begley Public School

History 
Walkerville Collegiate Institute officially opened its doors to the public on September 2, 1922. Located in the Olde Walkerville area, named for Hiram Walker, it is across the street from Willistead Park, the former estate of Edward Chandler Walker, the second son of Hiram Walker.

The school started with 195 students and a staff of ten, with Mr. Robert Meade as Principal. Initially, there were 22 classrooms, an area for manual training for the boys, a cooking and sewing area for the girls, a wood-panelled library, a gymnasium, "The Plunge" pool, and an auditorium.

In 1929, Walkerville's kilted Cadet Corps was formed and the Pipe Band was recognized through competition as the best in the province.

Major renovations were completed in 1957 with the addition of a new gymnasium, cafeteria, rifle range and quartermaster stores and a new music room. The main office was renovated in 1966, new classrooms were added along, and the changing area for the girls' physical education classes was improved.

In 1986, the Community living program was added. In 1989, Walkerville was selected as the home for the Walkerville Centre for the Creative Arts and facilities expanded again to meet the needs of Vocal and Instrumental Music, Art and Dance as well as painting, printmaking and sculpture programs.

Starting in 2021, the school started a major renovation project. The project includes, but is not limited to, the replacement of all the building's windows, the infill of the closed pool, renovation of the cafeteria, relocation of the music and dance classrooms and re–pointing of the exterior masonry.

Today, there are over 800 students and a staff of 70. "Nil sine Labore" (Nothing Without Work) remains the school motto.

WCCA 
WCCA (Walkerville Centre for the Creative Arts), is an art program including drama, dance, visual arts, media arts, vocal and instrumental music. All students must audition to be accepted into the programs. Teachers and small group tutors specializing in a particular arts program collaborate to improve the artistic students in their work.

Visual arts program 
The WCCA visual arts program includes painting, sculpture, printmaking, and drawing. The students begin with fundamental principles of design and drawing in grade 9. Twice every year, the WCCA visual and media arts students organize a show at the local ArtSpeak gallery. Students have exhibited artwork at Windsor's Art in the Park, and have been included in many other local shows.

Music program 
The largest section in the music program is the band program. Within the band is another section, known as Wind Ensemble or Senior band. This much smaller group is composed of senior or advanced level band students, and the Wind Ensemble has its own series of performances that run in tandem with the full concert band. Followed by the band program is the Pit Orchestra. Pit Orchestra is, depending on the year and number of students, smaller than Wind Ensemble and typically occurs once a year, with one major performance.

Drama program 
In 2009, WCCA drama participated in the Sears Drama Festival and advanced to the Provincials Showcase level with the play "The Insanity of Mary Girard." The following year, they performed again in the Sears Festival, with the original play "The Holding Room" moving onto the Provincials as well. The play was based on the murder of Reena Virk.

In August 2010, a group of 30 students from the WCCA drama program were invited to Edinburgh, Scotland for the Edinburgh Fringe Festival. While there, they performed the comedy musical, The Drowsy Chaperone.

In August 2014, A number of students from the WCCA drama program returned to Edinburgh, Scotland for the Edinburgh Fringe Festival. While they were there, they performed In the Heights.

On May 8, 2020, a former WCCA Drama teacher John-Anthony Nabben was found guilty of professional misconduct, approximately four years after claims were filed that he abused students "physically, sexually, verbally, psychologically or emotionally".

Sears productions 
Every Year, WCCA drama enters a play into the Sears Ontario Drama Festival. Recent plays have included:
2007/2008: Tuesdays and Sundays
2008/2009: The Insanity of Mary Girard
2009/2010: The Holding Room (Original Play written by John-Anthony Nabben and students)
2010/2011: The Shape of Sarah (Original Play written by John-Anthony Nabben and students)
2012/2013: It's an Art Thing (Original Play written by John-Anthony Nabben and students)
2013/2014: This is For You, Anna
2014/2015: Dracula Abridged
2015/2016: Ernest and the Pale Moon
2018/2019: The Tell-Tale Heart

Past productions 
Most years, Walkerville has the honour of performing two major shows per school year—a straight drama and a musical—with music provided by the WCCA Student Orchestra.

Notable graduates 
 Tamia Hill (formerly Tamia Washington) is a Grammy-nominated R&B singer and actress.
Llewellya Hillis (1930–2019), marine biologist
 Steve Bacic, actor, appeared in TV shows including Andromeda, 21 Jump Street, Street Justice, The Commish, Highlander, Call of the Wild, Stargate:SG–1 and The X–Files.
 Sylvia Fedoruk, Medical Physicist specializing in cobalt-60 cancer treatment, inducted into the Canadian Medical Hall of Fame.

See also
List of high schools in Ontario
In Richard Ford’s 2013 novel, Canada,  the central figure, Dell Parsons becomes a teacher of English literature at Walkerville,  commencing in 1981 and retiring about 2011.

References

Educational institutions established in 1922
High schools in Windsor, Ontario
Art schools in Canada
1922 establishments in Ontario